Liu Zaifu (born 10 October 1941) is a Chinese author, poet, and professor in literature and the liberal arts. Liu is particularly well known for his work "Reflections on Dream of the Red Chamber", which analyzes the Chinese classic "Dream of the Red Chamber", but with Liu's personal viewpoints and philosophy. He has lectured at the University of Chicago, University of Colorado, University of Stockholm, and the City University of Hong Kong, where he served as an honorary professor in 2004.

Personal life 
Liu was born in Nan'an, Quanzhou, Fujian, in what was then the Republic of China during the Second World War. Siding with the Communists, Liu took particular interest in Marxist literature, but put his own morals and messages behind the pieces, rather than those given by the party.

Liu Zaifu graduated from Xiamen University in 1963 with a degree in Chinese literature. After his graduation, he became the editor-in-chief of Wenxue Pinglun (Literary Review), a Chinese periodical discussing literary works.

During the Cultural Revolution, Liu was placed under house arrest for his personal views of Marxist belief and doctrine not matching those of the party. He was given protection by future President Hu Jintao.

Towards the end of the Cultural Revolution, Liu traveled abroad, going to Taiwan, Hong Kong, and the United States among other places, which would end up influencing his works, along with spreading his literature abroad outside of China.

Works 

 Lu Xun and Natural Science (Theory) (1977)
 Comments on Heng Meiji and Yang Zhijie (1978)
 Rain Silk Set (1979)
 Lu Xun's Biography (1981)
 On Lu Xun's Aesthetic Thought (1981)
 Farewell (1983)
 Deep Sea Pursuit (1983)
 Sun? Land? Man (1984)
 White Rushes (1985)
 Theory of Character Composition (1986)
 Liu Zaifu's Essay (1986)
 Reflections on Literature (1986)
 Human? Mother-in-law? Love (1988)
 Chinese People and Tradition (1988)
 On the Design of Human Culture in China (1988)
 Liu Zaifu's Prose Poem Collection (1988)
 Liu Zai Collection (1988)
 Human Goddess of Love (2013)
 Laughter for the Search (2013)
 Reading the Bohai Sea Again (2013)

References 

1941 births
Living people
20th-century Chinese writers
21st-century Chinese writers
Xiamen University alumni
Chinese literary theorists